Marne-la-Vallée is a new town located near Paris, France.

Disneyland Paris, Walt Disney Studios Park, Val d'Europe, Université Paris-Est Marne-la-Vallée, ESIEE Paris, and École des Ponts ParisTech are located in Marne-la-Vallée.

Status

Total population (2007) is 282,150.

For administrative purposes, the area has been divided into four sectors:

Demographics

As of 1990 fewer than 10,000 persons of East/Southeast Asian origin resided in six communes of Marne-la-Vallée. 26% of the population of Lognes was Asian, and other percentages were 8% in Noisiel, 5-6% in Noisy-le-Grand, and 5-6% in Torcy. In 1982 there were 6,000 Asians in Marne-la-Vallée, making up 3-4% of the area's population. In 1987 the number increased to 9,000.

Economy

Education 
 École des ponts ParisTech

In popular culture

Louise, the main character in Éric Rohmer's 1984 film Full Moon in Paris, shares an apartment with her partner Rémi in Marne-la-Vallée.

Notes

References

External links

 Official Site

 
New towns in Île-de-France
Geography of Seine-et-Marne
Geography of Seine-Saint-Denis
Geography of Val-de-Marne
New towns started in the 1960s